The Scottish Gaelic Wikipedia is Scottish Gaelic version of Wikipedia.

History
The encyclopedia was founded in 2004. In 2017, Susan Ross was hired by the National Library of Scotland (NLS) to develop and promote the encyclopedia, a part time position that lasted 12 months. The NLS intended to augment its Gaelic resources following a digitization drive that put Gaelic-language materials on the Internet. Ross is a second-language speaker of Gaelic who learned the language as a teenager and completed a doctorate in Gaelic studies. She has been editing Uicipeid since 2010. Working with community groups, she created help pages and worked to attract more editors. The grant was sponsored by Wikimedia UK and Bòrd na Gàidhlig.

At one point, Sabhal Mòr Ostaig offered a module teaching students how to edit Uicipeid.

See also
 Irish Wikipedia
 Welsh Wikipedia
 Breton Wikipedia

References

External links
 Susan Ross gives a presentation on her work
 2017 Celtic Knot conference

Wikipedias by language
Scottish Gaelic language
Internet properties established in 2004
Scottish encyclopedias
Wikipedias in Celtic languages